Libya participated at the 2018 Summer Youth Olympics in Buenos Aires, Argentina from 6 October to 18 October 2018.

Judo

 Boys' -66kg - 1 quota

Individual

Team

Weightlifting

Libya qualified one athlete based on its performance at the 2018 African Youth Championships.

 Boys' events - 1 quota

References

2018 in Libyan sport
Nations at the 2018 Summer Youth Olympics
Libya at the Youth Olympics